Walter Ernest Butler (23 August 1898 – 1 August 1978) was a working occultist, author and the Founder and first Director of Servants of the Light in Britain.

Early life
His first training in the mysteries was with Robert King, a bishop in the Liberal Catholic Church, who trained him as a medium. Butler later became a priest in the Liberal Catholic Church.

While in India, he studied with Indian mystics and also came into contact with Theosophist mystic Annie Besant, who politely rejected his requests to study with her. He returned to England and joined Dion Fortune's Society of the Inner Light in 1925, where he continued to train and participate until sometime toward the end of World War II.

Career
In 1962 he met Gareth Knight and, with Knight, began to develop a correspondence course in Qabalah for Helios Books. During this time he also rejoined the Society of the Inner Light, where he met Michael Nowicki and Dolores Ashcroft-Nowicki. By 1973, the Helios Course in the Practical Qabalah had gained popularity and was spun off to form the Servants of the Light, for which Ernest was the first Director of Studies. He remained director of studies until shortly before his death, when he passed that responsibility to Dolores Ashcroft-Nowicki.

Personality and personal life

W. E. Butler worked many years as an engineer. Later on he was a member of the technical staff at University of Southampton, England.
By the 1970s, Butler was living in a Tudor cottage with limestone walls and a thatched roof, Little Thatches, which was located in Hillstreet, Calmore, Southampton .
Janine Chapman met Butler in the 1970s, noting that he had a Yorkshire accent, and commenting on a "paternal sort of goodness about him". She moreover highlighted that he had "the very pale white skin of a Celt, a round face, thin lips, and a kindly smile."

Bibliography
Magic: Its Ritual, Power and Purpose, 1952
The Magician: His Training and Work, 1959
Apprenticed to Magic, 1962
Magic and the Qabalah, 1964
How to Develop Clairvoyance, 1968
How to Read the Aura, 1971
How to Develop Psychometry, 1971
How to Develop Telepathy, 1975
Practical Magic and the Western Mystery Tradition, 1986
Lords of Light: The Path of Initiation in the Western Mysteries, 1990

Sources

Footnotes

Sources

 
 
 Knight, Gareth (2002). Servants of the Light biography of W. E. Butler. Retrieved 30 September 2004.

1898 births
1978 deaths
British occult writers
Hermetic Qabalists
Society of the Inner Light
English engineers